Rägavere may refer to:
Rägavere, Rakvere Parish
Rägavere, Tapa Parish